According to 19th-century directories, Nowhere or No-Where is a marshy area by the River Bure where the villagers of Acle, Norfolk had salt-pans to produce salt for food preservation, etc. 
In 1861 there were four inhabited houses and 16 people. 

Originally an extra-parochial liberty, it was formally incorporated into Acle parish in 1862 and the name no longer appears in maps and gazetteers.

External links
 Page at GenUKI quoting directories such as:
 White's History, Gazetteer & Directory of Norfolk, 1883
 Kelly's Directory of Norfolk, 1904
Either or both may well be parts of Nowhere.
 

Geography of Norfolk